The Cruel Sea or Cruel Sea may refer to:

The Cruel Sea (novel), 1951 novel by Nicholas Monsarrat
The Cruel Sea (1953 film), a 1953 war film made of the above book, starring Jack Hawkins
The Cruel Sea (1972 film), a 1972 Kuwaiti film and the first Kuwaiti film to be produced
The Cruel Sea (band), Australian indie rock band formed in the 1980s
"The Cruel Sea" (song), 1963 instrumental by The Dakotas; in the U.S. aka "The Cruel Surf"
"Cruel Sea", television series episode of Walking with Dinosaurs